Alison Humby (born 7 December 1972) is a retired English badminton player. Humby is a three time English junior champion, two-time medalist at the European junior championships and winner of several international tournaments in Netherlands, Hungary, Ireland and the EBU circuit in 1992/93 in her career lasting twelve years after she finally chose to retire at the age of 23.

Achievements

World Junior Championships 
The Bimantara World Junior Championships was an international invitation badminton tournament for junior players. It was held in Jakarta, Indonesia from 1987 to 1991.

Girls' doubles

European Junior Championships 
Girls' singles

Girls' doubles

IBF International 
Women's singles

Women's doubles

References 

1972 births
Living people
English female badminton players